New Haven is a city in Adams, Jefferson, and St. Joseph townships, Allen County, Indiana, United States. It sits to the east of the city of Fort Wayne, the second largest city in Indiana, and is situated mostly along the southern banks of the Maumee River. The population was 14,794 as of the 2010 census.

History

New Haven was platted in 1839 by Henry Burgess and was incorporated as a town under Indiana law in 1865. It became incorporated as a city in 1963. Several homes built by the Burgess family remain in New Haven. A Burgess home on Summit Street is the oldest brick structure in Jefferson Township. Henry Burgess' son-in-law, E.W. Green built a large frame Greek Revival house on the hill above what is now Schnelker Park and the former New Haven Elementary School building. Another Burgess structure remains at the corner of Summit and Eben Streets. In 1845 the Swiss Amish arrived in the region, and what makes them distinct is that they speak an Alsatian German Language.

New Haven's history has been shaped significantly by transportation. It was located along the Wabash and Erie Canal (the Gronauer Lock of the canal was unearthed during construction of Interstate 469 in the late-1980s, and is now on display at the Indiana State Museum in Indianapolis). Later, the city was served by the Wabash and Nickel Plate Railroads. Norfolk Southern Railway maintains a significant operation in New Haven today. U.S. Routes 24 and 30 (the historic Lincoln Highway), as well as Interstate 469, serve residents.

The Fort Wayne Railroad Historical Society operates east of New Haven on Edgerton Road. The society has restored Nickel Plate 765 built by the Lima Locomotive Works of Lima, Ohio and restored the Craigville Depot, which are housed at the New Haven site.

The historic French settlement of Besançon is on the eastern edge of New Haven along the Lincoln Highway. Saint Louis Catholic Church at Besançon is now on the National Register of Historic Places.  Also listed is the Wabash Railroad Depot.

New Haven was the home of a weekly newspaper, Allen County Times, until the summer of 2002. The paper served New Haven, Leo-Cedarville, Grabill, Harlan, Woodburn, Hoagland, and Monroeville.

Geography
New Haven is located at  (41.067648, -85.021480).

New Haven was the westernmost point of prehistoric glacial Lake Maumee which was an extension of Lake Erie. The bed of Lake Maumee then became the Great Black Swamp, which covered an area between New Haven and present-day Toledo, Ohio. The route of the old Lincoln Highway east of New Haven follows the southern lakebank of glacial Lake Maumee, a notable geological feature.

Climate

Demographics

As of the census of 2010, there were 14,794 people, 200 households, and 3,986 families residing in the city. The racial makeup of the city was 93.2% White, 3.3% African American, 0.4% Native American, 0.4% Asian, 0.1% Pacific Islander, 0.9% from other races,0.16 MLG, and 1.7% from two or more races. Hispanic or Latino of any race were 3.1% of the population.

There were 5,839 households, of which 33.5% had children under the age of 18 living with them, 49.8% were married couples living together, 14.0% had a female householder with no husband present, 4.4% had a male householder with no wife present, and 31.7% were non-families. 26.9% of all households were made up of individuals, and 10.4% had someone living alone who was 65 years of age or older. The average household size was 2.52 and the average family size was 3.05.

The median age in the city was 35.5 years. 26.2% of residents were under the age of 18; 8.4% were between the ages of 18 and 24; 25.6% were from 25 to 44; 25.8% were from 45 to 64; and 13.9% were 65 years of age or older. The gender makeup of the city was 48.1% male and 51.9% female.

Government
New Haven is governed by a mayor-council government. The current mayor is Republican Steven McMichael. Past mayors include Republican Walter Krueck, Republican Herbert Brudi, Republican Terry Werling, Democrat Eugene Taylor, Republican Lynn Shaw, and Democrat-turned-Republican Terry McDonald.

Education

Almost all of New Haven is in the East Allen County Schools (EACS) public school district. EACS offices are headquartered in New Haven.

Most areas are assigned to New Haven Primary School, New Haven Intermediate School, and New Haven Junior High School/New Haven High School. Previously New Haven Middle School had its own building. As of May 25, 2019, New Haven Middle School is being torn down and grades 7 and 8 will be moving to the High School into the recently added Junior High section. The sixth grade will be moved to the new Intermediate building along with grades 3–5. So when the 2019–2020 school year begins, the only New Haven titled schools in function will be New Haven High and Junior High School, New Haven Intermediate, and New Haven Primary.

Small portions of the city limits are in the Paul Harding Junior High School feeder pattern, the Woodlan Junior/Senior High School feeder pattern, and the Heritage Junior/Senior High School feeder pattern. Another small part of the city is zoned to Fort Wayne Community Schools (FWCS): Haley Elementary School, Blackhawk Middle School, and Snider High School.

Private education is offered through two Catholic schools, Saint John the Baptist Catholic School and Saint Louis Academy, and one Lutheran school, Central Lutheran School.

Allen County Public Library serves residents through the New Haven Library Branch.

Economy
New Haven is surrounded by an abundance of fertile soil, making agriculture the largest visible economic asset. Corporate headquarters of Do It Best hardware stores is located in New Haven, along with Central States Grain, a large soybean and grain processor, has its operational headquarters in New Haven. O'Neal Steel, the nation's sixth largest steel center, operates a New Haven branch. Other major employers include East Allen County Schools, Norfolk Southern, and BFGoodrich (located in nearby Woodburn, Indiana).

Notable people

 Lloy Ball, professional volleyball player, Olympic gold medalist, 2008 Summer Olympics
 David Doster, former player for MLB Philadelphia Phillies
 Allan H. Dougall, recipient of the Medal of Honor.
 Norm Ellenberger, former head coach of the University of New Mexico Lobos and assistant coach to the NBA Chicago Bulls
 Sharon Rose Gabet – Daytime television actress, late 1970s, 1980s.
 Bubbles Hargrave, former player for MLB Chicago Cubs, Cincinnati Reds and New York Yankees
 Pinky Hargrave, former player for MLB Washington Senators, St. Louis Browns, Detroit Tigers and Boston Braves
 Mitchell 'Mitch' V. Harper - lawyer, former Indiana legislator and Fort Wayne City Council president
 Phyllis Pond, Indiana legislator and educator
 Lorna G. Schofield, Judge of the US Southern District Court of New York

References

External links

 City of New Haven, Indiana website 
 

Cities in Indiana
Cities in Allen County, Indiana
Fort Wayne, IN Metropolitan Statistical Area
Populated places established in 1865